Kurt Meyer (1910–1961) was an officer in the Waffen-SS

Kurt Meyer may also refer to:

Kurt Meyer (Lucerne) (born 1944), member of the cantonal government of Lucerne, Switzerland, 1995–2005
Kurt Meyer (sport shooter) (born 1933), German Olympic shooter
Kurt Meyer (architect) (1922–2014), American architect
Kurt Heinrich Meyer (1883–1952), German chemist

See also
Kurt Meier (born 1962), Swiss bobsledder
Curt Meyer (1919–2011), German mathematician
Curt Meyer-Clason (1910–2012), German writer and translator
Curt Meier (born 1953), American politician